John Acorn is a Canadian naturalist. He is a lecturer at the University of Alberta, a research associate at the Royal Tyrrell Museum of Paleontology, and a research associate at the E.H. Strickland Entomology Museum. He is also a local Edmonton celebrity, combining folk music with educational lyrics about the natural world.

Television Series 
John Acorn became publicly known for his television series Acorn, the Nature Nut.  88 episodes were produced, each focusing on a different aspect of the natural world, and which featured folk songs, whimsical descriptions like Flying Neon Toothpicks in the Grass, and characters like Skibibad Windfield.  He was also the host of Twits and Pishers a series about birdwatching that ran for two seasons on the Discovery Channel.

Acorn also appears in recorded displays at the Royal Tyrrell Museum of Paleontology.

Publications 
 Birds of Alberta (Authored with Chris C. Fisher and Gary Ross)
 Birds of Coastal British Columbia (Authored with Nancy Baron and Ted Nordhagen)
 Birds of the Pacific Northwest Coast (Authored with Nancy Baron)
 Bugs of Alberta (Authored with Ian Sheldon)
 Bugs of British Columbia (Authored with Ian Sheldon)
 Bugs of Northern California (Authored with Ian Sheldon)
 Bugs of Ontario (Authored with Ian Sheldon)
 Bugs of Washington and Oregon (Authored with Ian Sheldon)
 Butterflies of Alberta
 Butterflies of British Columbia (Authored with Ian Sheldon)
 Compact Guide to Alberta Birds  (Authored with Chris Fisher and Andy Bezener)
 Damselflies of Alberta: Flying Neon Toothpicks in the Grass
 Deep Alberta: Fossil Facts and Dinosaur Digs
 Ladybugs of Alberta: Finding the Spots and Connecting the Dots
 Tiger Beetles of Alberta: Killers on the Clay, Stalkers on the Sand

Awards 
 2013 Medal of Honor, Entomological Foundation
 2012 Royal Society of Canada McNeil Medal
 2008 NSERC Michael Smith Award for Science Promotion
 2005 Distinguished Alumni Award. University of Alberta
 2000 Emerald Award of Interpretation Canada for Gallery Videos at the Royal Tyrell Museum
 1998 ALBERTA SCIENCE AND TECHNOLOGY, ASTech excellence in science & technology journalism
 1998 GEMINI AWARD nomination
 1996 GEMINI AWARD nomination
 1997 AMPIA AWARD, Alberta Motion Picture industry awards.
 1997 Edmonton Nature Centre Foundation
 1997 Calgary Zoo, Pachyderm Award
 1995 AMPIA AWARD, Alberta Motion Picture Industries Awards

References

External links 

 Official Website

Canadian naturalists
Canadian television hosts
Living people
1958 births
Scientists from Edmonton
Academic staff of the University of Alberta